David Attenborough's Conquest of the Skies 3D is a British natural history television series tracking the evolution of flight in animals. Attenborough analyses gliding reptiles, parachuting mammals, acrobatic insects and the world of birds.

Production
The series was shot on location in China, Segovia, Rome, Scotland, Ecuador and Borneo.

Broadcast
David Attenborough's Conquest of the Skies 3D television broadcast began on 1 January 2015 on Sky 3D and Sky 1 HD. The UK broadcast consisted of three episodes, with a single making-of documentary called simply The Making of David Attenborough's Conquest of the Skies to be broadcast after the last general episode on 15 January 2015.

Episodes

References

External links
 
 
Extended trailer

2015 British television series debuts
2015 British television series endings
2010s British documentary television series
Documentary films about nature
English-language television shows
David Attenborough
Sky UK original programming
Animal flight
3D television shows